Philip Manyim (born 24 March 1978) is a former Kenyan steeplechaser turned marathon runner. During his career, Manyim was a pacesetter in steeplechase and competed in IAAF Grand Prix and IAAF Super Grand Prix events held from 2002 to 2004. Manyim left steeplechase for marathon running in 2004 and won the 2005 Berlin Marathon with a time of 2:07:41. His other World Marathon Majors performances was an eighteenth place finish at the 2007 Boston Marathon and fourth place at the 2007 Berlin event. Manyim ended his running career at a 2010 marathon in Ljubljana, where he came in eight place.

Early life
Manyim was born on 24 March 1978 in Uasin Gishu County, Kenya.

Career
Manyim started his sports career participating in road races primarily throughout Italy, Kenya and the United States from 1999 to 2004. During this time period, Manyim was a pacesetter and competitor in steeplechase. As a steeplechaser, Manyim participated in multiple IAAF Grand Prix and IAAF Super Grand Prix events between 2002 and 2004. His best Grand Prix performance was a fifth place finish at Zagreb in 2003. Manyim also ran in IAAF Golden League meets while racing in the Grand Prixs, but did not finish any of his races.

After a 2004 steeplechase race in Switzerland, Manyim decided to switch from steeplechase to marathon. In a 2007 interview with Runners World, Manyim said he went to marathon running because "a pacer does nothing but make a name for other people". After running in marathons held in Amsterdam, Rome, and Prague, Manyim won the 2005 Berlin Marathon with a time of 2:07:41. In other World Marathon Majors, Manyim was eighteenth at the 2007 Boston Marathon and fourth at the 2007 Berlin event. Manyim's final race was at a 2010 marathon in Ljubljana where he had an eighth place finish.

Personal life
Manyim is married and has two children.

References

1978 births
Kenyan male steeplechase runners
Kenyan male marathon runners
Berlin Marathon male winners
Living people
People from Uasin Gishu County